Samuel Byrem Crane (September 13, 1894 in Harrisburg, Pennsylvania – November 12, 1955 in Philadelphia), was a professional baseball player who played shortstop from 1914 to 1922.

Crane was convicted of the murder of his girlfriend Dela Lyter and her boyfriend John Oren in the spring of 1930 and sentenced to 18–36 years in prison. His former manager Connie Mack eventually arranged for his parole in 1944.

External links

1894 births
1955 deaths
Major League Baseball shortstops
Brooklyn Robins players
Philadelphia Athletics players
Washington Senators (1901–1960) players
Cincinnati Reds players
Baseball players from Harrisburg, Pennsylvania
Greensboro Patriots players
Richmond Climbers players
Baltimore Orioles (IL) players
Indianapolis Indians players
Seattle Indians players
Buffalo Bisons (minor league) players
Reading Keystones players
American people convicted of murder
American sportspeople convicted of crimes
Sportspeople convicted of murder